The Erkekler Basketbol Süper Ligi (English: Men's Basketball League) and known as the Kıbrıs Vakıflar Bankası Basketbol Süper Ligi due to sponsorship reasons is the top men's professional basketball league in Northern Cyprus. Erkekler Basketbol Süper Ligi was founded in 1981. It is run by the Turkish Cypriot Basketball Federation.

Current teams

Recent champions
2006–07 – Koop Spor
2007–08 – Gönyeli 
2008–09 – Gönyeli
2009–10 – Gönyeli
2010–11 – Gönyeli
2011–12 – Yenicami
2012–13 – Koop Spor
2013–14 – Yakın Doğu Üniversitesi
2014–15 – Mapfree
2015–16 – Koop Spor
2016–17 – Yakın Doğu Üniversitesi
2017–18 – Yakın Doğu Üniversitesi
2018–19 – Yakın Doğu Üniversitesi

Source:

References

External links
 Turkish Cypriot basketball on Eurobasket
 KKTC Basketbol Federasyonu
 North Cyprus Basketball

Basketball leagues in Europe
Sports leagues established in 1981
Sports competitions in Northern Cyprus
1981 establishments in Cyprus
Basketball in Northern Cyprus